

410001–410100 

|-bgcolor=#f2f2f2
| colspan=4 align=center | 
|}

410101–410200 

|-bgcolor=#f2f2f2
| colspan=4 align=center | 
|}

410201–410300 

|-bgcolor=#f2f2f2
| colspan=4 align=center | 
|}

410301–410400 

|-bgcolor=#f2f2f2
| colspan=4 align=center | 
|}

410401–410500 

|-id=475
| 410475 Robertschulz || 2008 DN || Robert Schulz (born 1972), an Austrian amateur astronomer and astrophotographer. Together with Wolfgang Neszmerak, he has built an observatory near the Holzleiten Saddle in Austria. || 
|}

410501–410600 

|-bgcolor=#f2f2f2
| colspan=4 align=center | 
|}

410601–410700 

|-id=619
| 410619 Fabry ||  || Charles Fabry (1867–1945), a French physicist and optician. || 
|}

410701–410800 

|-bgcolor=#f2f2f2
| colspan=4 align=center | 
|}

410801–410900 

|-id=817
| 410817 Zaffino || 2009 MN || Matt Zaffino (born 1961), an American meteorologist, whose nightly weathercast for a network TV station in Portland, Oregon, features excellent tips for astronomical events and other science phenomena. || 
|-id=835
| 410835 Neszmerak ||  || Wolfgang "Wolfman" Neszmerak (born 1969), an Austrian amateur astronomer, musician and photographer. || 
|}

410901–411000 

|-id=912
| 410912 Lisakaroline ||  || Lisa Bachleitner (born 1990) and Karoline Bachleitner (born 1994) are the daughters of Austrian discoverer Hannes Bachleitner || 
|-id=928
| 410928 Maidbronn ||  || Maidbronn, a small village in northern Bavaria, Germany, where the discovering Maidbronn Observatory is located. || 
|}

References 

410001-411000